Installatron is a multi-platform application installer that provides a graphical interface and automation tools designed to simplify the process of deploying and managing web applications. Installatron is available as a plug-in for popular web hosting control panels. Installatron is multi-platform and compatible with Linux, BSD, and Windows. The developers maintain support for many web hosting control panels:

Applications provided by Installatron are many and cover a broad number of categories.

In 2008, it was made possible to activate Installatron for free for a single domain while maintaining all the functionality.

In 2009, Windows support was made which in turn added support for the Parallels Plesk Windows and cPanel Enkompass web hosting control panels.

See also
 Fantastico (web hosting)
 Softaculous

References

External links
 Installatron website

Web hosting